Kenji Treschuk (born December 26, 1982 in Honolulu, Hawaii) is an American soccer player, currently for Wan Chai Sports Federation.

Career

College and amateur
Treschuk attended Moanalua High School, who he led in scoring his junior and senior seasons, and played club soccer for the amateur Honolulu Bulls of the Men's Island Soccer Organization. He was offered scholarships at several small colleges, but opted to take a year off after high school. During that time, he played for several mainland traveling teams. When Penn State soccer coach Barry Gorman held a camp in Honolulu, Treschuk caught his eye.  That brought an offer to play for Penn State, and was offered a scholarship after his freshman season. While there he was a three time Big Ten All Academic Team.

After graduating from Penn State, Treschuk spent several months playing for amateur HCSC in the town of Den Helder, Netherlands in 2005. He had trials with several professional teams in the Netherlands, but was not offered a contract. He spent time with another amateur Dutch team, AFC34, in 2006 before returning to the United States in 2007.

Professional
After moving back to the United States in 2007 Treschuk signed with the Seattle Sounders of USL First Division. Following a rookie season that saw him score 15 times in 26 regular season games, became the Sounders' enforcer on the way to a United Soccer Leagues First Division title and Rookie of the Year honors in 2007 USL-1 Award Finalists announced.

Treschuk was invited to the Seattle Sounders FC training camp, but was not offered a contract with the expansion Major League Soccer team; instead, he moved to Charleston Battery in February 2009.

Career statistics
(correct as of 10 July 2010)

Honors
 2007 USL First Division Rookie of the Year

Seattle Sounders
USL First Division Championship (1): 2007
USL First Division Commissioner's Cup (1): 2007

References

External links
 Charleston Battery bio

1982 births
Living people
American soccer players
Soccer players from Honolulu
Charleston Battery players
Seattle Sounders (1994–2008) players
USL First Division players
Penn State Nittany Lions men's soccer players
Association football defenders
Association football midfielders